Absolute Power may refer to:

General uses
Lord Acton's dictum, "Power tends to corrupt, and absolute power corrupts absolutely"
The power held by the sovereign of an absolute monarchy
The power held by a leader of an autocracy or dictatorship
Omnipotence, unlimited power, as of a deity

Books
Absolute Power (novel), a 1996 novel by David Baldacci
Absolute Power: The Helen Clark Years, a 2008 book by Ian Wishart
"Absolute Power", a story arc from Superman/Batman comic book series

Film and television
Absolute Power (film), a 1997 film based on Baldacci's novel
Absolute Power (radio and TV series), a BBC television and radio series
"Absolute Power" (Stargate SG-1), an episode of the television series Stargate SG-1
"Absolute Power" (Superman: The Animated Series), a 1999 episode of Superman: The Animated Series

Music
Absolute Power (Tech N9ne album), 2002
"Absolute Power", a 2002 song by heavy metal band Blitzkrieg
Absolute Power (Pro-Pain album), 2010
The Day the Earth Shook – The Absolute Power, a 2005 DVD by American heavy metal band Manowar

See also
Absolute square
Absolute (disambiguation)
Power (disambiguation)